Events from the year 1672 in China.

Incumbents 
 Kangxi Emperor (11th year)

Events 
 Hongfu Temple (Guiyang) (Chinese: 弘福寺; pinyin: Hóngfú Sì) a Buddhist temple located on Mount Qianling, in Yunyan District of Guiyang, Guizhou, is first built
 Sino-Russian border conflicts

Births 
 March 12 — Yunzhi, Prince Zhi (1672 – 1735), also known as Yunzhi, formally known as Prince Zhi of the Second Rank between 1698 and 1708, a Manchu prince of the Qing dynasty
 October 29 — Zhang Tingyu (Chinese: 張廷玉 1672 – 1755) Han Chinese politician and historian who lived in the Qing dynasty serving the Kangxi, Yongzheng and Qianlong emperors

Deaths 
 Lu Shiyi, (b. 1611) Confucian scholar
 Zhou Lianggong, (b. 1612) artist, writer, and official serving Ming and Qing dynasties

References

 
 .

 
China